Le Canonnier is a multi-use stadium in Mouscron, Belgium. It is currently used mostly for football matches and was the home ground of Royal Excel Mouscron until the club was folded in 2022.  The stadium holds 10,800 people.

References

External links

Football venues in Wallonia
Sports venues in Hainaut (province)
Sport in Mouscron